The 2019–20 Biathlon World Cup – Stage 6 was the sixth event of the season and is held in Pokljuka, Slovenia, from 23 to 26 January 2020.

Schedule of events 
The events took place at the following times.

Medal winners

Men

Women

Mixed

References 

Biathlon World Cup - Stage 6, 2019-20
2019–20 Biathlon World Cup
Biathlon competitions in Slovenia
Biathlon World Cup